Kathleen E. Taylor is a popular science author and a research scientist in the Department of Physiology, Anatomy and Genetics at the University of Oxford. In July 2012 she was appointed as a Science Fellow of the Institute for Food, Brain and Behaviour.

Education
Taylor attended the University of Oxford where she studied physiology and philosophy. She obtained a master's degree in psychology from Stirling University, and received her doctorate in computational neuroscience from the University of Oxford.

Research
Taylor performed postdoctoral research in the areas of neuroimmunology and cognitive neuroscience. She is a neuroscientist at the University of Oxford and works out of the university's Department of Physiology, Anatomy and Genetics. She performs research in the areas of physiology, psychology and the neuroscience of belief.

Published work
In 2003 Taylor won first prize in both the THES/OUP Science Essay competition and the THES Humanities and Social Sciences Writing Prize.

Brainwashing: The Science of Thought Control (2004), her first book, was "highly commended" and runner-up in the 2005 Times Higher Education Supplement Young Academic Author Award, and also made it to the shortlist for the 2005 MIND "Book of the Year Award". The book also made it to the longlist of the 2005 Aventis "Science Book Prize", where it was described as containing "elegant and accessible prose".

Cruelty: Human evil and the human brain (2009) examined human cruelty, from the points of view of biology and sociology.

The Brain Supremacy (2012) uses recent examples from scientific literature and the media to explore how techniques such as fMRI function and how they could apparently be useful for thought identification. The book gives an overview of the latest advances in neuroscience while also looking at the practical and ethical side of new technologies. Taylor peers into the future and looks at how all the advances in neuroscience in its social and ethical context could possibly affect our behaviour and impact our daily lives.

The Fragile Brain (2016) explains dementia, what is known about its causes, its effects on victims, their families, and society, and ongoing research looking for effective treatment and prevention.

References

External links

 

Living people
Year of birth missing (living people)
Alumni of the University of Oxford
Academics of the University of Oxford
British neuroscientists
British women neuroscientists
British women scientists
British science writers
Alumni of the University of Stirling